Kristin Ruth Hedger is a North Dakota Democratic-NPL Party politician and businesswoman.

Hedger was the North Dakota Democratic-NPL Party's candidate for North Dakota Secretary of State in the 2006 general election. Hedger lost to the then 14-year Republican incumbent Alvin Jaeger by a 54-46% margin of the vote. It was Hedger's first political campaign as a statewide candidate. At age 26, she was the youngest to be a statewide candidate for public office anywhere in the United States during the 2006 election cycle.

References

External links
 http://www.kristinhedger.com

1980s births
Living people
North Dakota Democrats